Georges Charles Armand Tainturier (20 May 1890 – 7 December 1943) was a French fencer who won team épée gold medals at the 1924 and 1932 Olympics. In 1926 he won an unofficial world title in the individual épée.

Tainturier fought in World War I, was wounded, received the Croix de Guerre and was made a Knight of the Legion of Honor. During World War II he was a prominent member of the French Resistance. He was arrested in 1942 and executed in 1943. A fencing club is named after him in Compiègne.

References

External links
 

1890 births
1943 deaths
French male épée fencers
Olympic fencers of France
Fencers at the 1924 Summer Olympics
Fencers at the 1932 Summer Olympics
Olympic gold medalists for France
Olympic medalists in fencing
Medalists at the 1924 Summer Olympics
Medalists at the 1932 Summer Olympics
French people executed by Nazi Germany
Sportspeople from Vienne, Isère
Executed people from Rhône-Alpes
French Resistance members
Resistance members killed by Nazi Germany
People executed by Germany by decapitation
French civilians killed in World War II